Barry Hepburn (born 7 March 2004) is a Scottish professional footballer who plays as a winger for German club Bayern Munich II.

Club career

As a youth player, Hepburn joined the youth academy of Scottish club Celtic. In 2020, he joined the youth academy of  German club Bayern Munich.

International career
Hepburn is a youth international for Scotland, having played for the Scotland U16s, U17s, and U19s.

References

External links

 

2004 births
Association football wingers
Expatriate footballers in Germany
FC Bayern Munich II players
Living people
Regionalliga players
Scotland youth international footballers
Scottish expatriate footballers
Scottish expatriate sportspeople in Germany
Scottish footballers
Footballers from Stirling